Koonya may refer to:
 Koonya (1887), a  wood carvel screw steamer built in 1887
 Koonya, Tasmania, a populated place on the Tasman Peninsula, Tasmania, Australia
Koonya Garlic Festival, annual event in Koonya, Tasmania